Adam Sibery Crouch (born 16 May 1972) is an Australian politician who was elected to the New South Wales Legislative Assembly as the member for Terrigal for the Liberal Party at the 2015 New South Wales state election. After the 2019 New South Wales state election he was elected as the NSW Government Whip.

Crouch was a sales director for a printing firm before entering parliament, and won a close preselection against former federal government minister Jim Lloyd by a single vote.

He is the patron of the Terrigal Marine Rescue Squadron and Terrigal Surf Lifesaving Club and also an honorary member of the Terrigal Rotary and member of the NSW Parliamentary Lions Club.

See also
 Results of the New South Wales state elections: 2015 and 2019

References

 

1972 births
Living people
Liberal Party of Australia members of the Parliament of New South Wales
Members of the New South Wales Legislative Assembly
Place of birth missing (living people)
21st-century Australian politicians